Olympiacos Volou B.C. is the basketball department of the Greek multi-sport club of Olympiacos Volou, based in Volos. The club has teams both men's and women's. The women's basketball team stands out from the departments of the club because it is the only department of Olympiacos Volou that has won a Greek Championship. The club plays in Volos Municipal Stadium Indoor Hall, with a capacity of 1200 spectators.

Women's team
Olympiacos Volou won one Greek championship of the season 1977-78. It is the only title of the club. In 1997, it played in the final of Greek cup. The next years the club weakened and the late 1990s dissolved. The club returned in the action after merging with the Volos' club Artemis Volou. The last years, Olympiacos finds itself between A1 and A2 division.

Recent seasons

Honours
Greek Women's Basketball League
Winner (1): 1978
Greek Women's Basketball Cup
Finalist (1): 1997

References

Basketball teams in Greece
Women's basketball teams in Greece
Sport in Volos